Cerradomys marinhus, also known as Marinho's rice rat, is a rodent species from South America. It is found in Minas Gerais, Brazil. It was formerly known as Oryzomys marinhus, but was transferred to the new genus Cerradomys in 2006.

References

Literature cited

Percequillo, A.R., E. Hingst-Zaher, and C.R. Bonvicino. 2008. Systematic review of genus Cerradomys Weksler, Percequillo and Voss, 2006 (Rodentia: Cricetidae: Sigmodontinae: Oryzomyini), with description of two new species from Eastern Brazil. American Museum Novitates 3622: 1–46.

Mammals of Brazil
Cerradomys
Mammals described in 2003